Zdziechów may refer to the following places:
Zdziechów, Łódź Voivodeship (central Poland)
Zdziechów, Radom County in Masovian Voivodeship (east-central Poland)
Zdziechów, Szydłowiec County in Masovian Voivodeship (east-central Poland)